Shu Wang (蜀王, King/Prince of Shu) may refer to:

Qiao Zong (died 413), warlord who founded the Western Shu dynasty, given the title Prince of Shu by the Later Qin emperor
Yang Xiu (Sui dynasty) (573–618), Sui dynasty prince, known as Prince of Shu from 581 to 602
Li Ke (died 653), Tang dynasty prince, known as Prince of Shu from 627 to 636
Li Gui (prince) (750–783), Tang dynasty prince
Wang Jian (Former Shu) (847–918), warlord who founded the Former Shu dynasty, known as Prince of Shu from 903 to 907 during the Tang dynasty
Meng Zhixiang (874–934), warlord who founded the Later Shu dynasty, known as Prince of Shu from 933 to 934 during the Later Tang dynasty

See also

Wang Shu (born 1963), Chinese architect
An Dương Vương ( 3rd or 2nd century BC), king of Âu Lạc, supposedly a prince from the ancient Chinese state of Shu
Shu (disambiguation)
Wang (disambiguation)
Wangshu (disambiguation)